, better known by her ring name Rena or Reina, is a professional Japanese shoot wrestler, kickboxer and mixed martial artist, currently competing in the strawweight division of Rizin. 

A professional competitor since 2007, Kubota previously competed as a kickboxer in the flyweight division of Shootboxing. She is a record six-time Shootboxing Girls S-Cup tournament winner, having won every tournament she took part in, and is the former Shootboxing flyweight champion.

Sherdog ranked her as a top ten atomweight between October 18, 2017 and May 24, 2021, while Fight Matrix ranked her as a top ten atomweight between July 1, 2017 and January 1, 2018. She was furthermore ranked as a top ten pound for pound kickboxer by Combat Press between November 2016 and June 2017, as well as between August 2017 and May 2018.

Kickboxing career

Early life
She began training at Oikawa Dojo when she was a sixth grader.

Early career
She lost a split decision to Asami Furuya in the flyweight New Heroine tournament semi-final.

Kubota's next bout was her first in shoot boxing. Kubota won her next two fights in the Road to S-Cup series.

On , Kubota fought to a draw with MMA fighter Miku Matsumoto in the Deep promotion in a kickboxing match at ClubDEEP Toyama Barbarian Festival 7.

Matsumoto won the fight by unanimous decision. She was defeated via extra-round split decision against South Korean Muay Thai kickboxer Su Jeong Lim. The bout was Kubota's only fight for the promotion.

She defeated Tomoko SP by decision.

2009 Shootboxing Girls S-Cup
She defeated Masako Yoshida by decision, Saori Ishioka by TKO and finally Mei Yamaguchi by decision to win the tournament.

After winning the Girls S-Cup, Kubota won fights against Emi Fujino by TKO (doctor stoppage), Australian Christina Jurjevic by decision and Mika Nagai by decision in a rematch from their 2007 fight.

2010 Shoot Boxing Girls S-Cup 
The two would finally meet on  during the 2010 Shoot Boxing Girls S-Cup. Kubota stunned everyone including Watanabe with her speed and aggressiveness. The #2-ranked Watanabe had been very confident of winning, but Kubota shocked everyone with her powerful performance and she defeated Watanabe by TKO. Kubota delivered a devastating knee to the body which caused Watanabe to fall to her knees. Watanabe was holding her stomach and was in severe pain and unable to continue the match.

Kubota went on to defeat American MMA fighter Kate Martinez by decision in the semi-final, then defeated Ai Takahashi by decision after two extra rounds in the final to win her second straight Girls S-Cup.

While the show averaged 11.8% of TV rating, her appearance had the highest rating, 16.8%, and her ring name became the second-highest searched for keyword on Google Japan the next day.

As a result, Kubota faced J-Girls rising talent Erika Kamimura in an exhibition match in which Rena was knocked down once by her younger opponent in a single three-minute round, which surprised fans and pundits alike.

She was defeated by unanimous decision.

On , Kubota faced Thai Zaza Sor. Aree in a non-tournament bout at the 2011 Shoot Boxing Girls S-Cup. Rena trapped Zaza in a standing arm-triangle choke and Zaza struggled violently to escape but was unable to.  She was fading away and about to pass out when the referee broke the hold and awarded the point to Rena.  It's a pity the referee did not let Rena put Zaza to sleep and therefore win by KO.  Nevertheless, Rena won the match when she delivered a devastating punch to Sor Aree's stomach in round two which caused her to collapse to the mat.  Flat on her back and holding her stomach in agony, Sor Aree was not able to continue and Rena won the match.  This would be the second time that Rena's powerful attacks have left an opponent in so much pain that they are not able to get up and not able to continue the match.  The first opponent to collapse in pain was Hisae Watanabe.

She was defeated by majority decision after two extension rounds in a considerable upset.

She defeated Kamimura by unanimous decision to become the first Rise Queen champion.

2012 Shoot Boxing Girls S-Cup 
She defeated Kim Townsend, Seo Hee Ham and Mei Yamaguchi in succession to become the 2012 Shoot Boxing Girls S-Cup tournament champion.

She defeated Peiling via third-round KO. Rena locked in a standing arm-triangle choke and then switched to a rear-naked choke. The referee stopped the match as Peiling was starting to lose consciousness.

She defeated Klijn by majority decision after an extension round.

On , at Shoot Boxing Battle Summit: Ground Zero Tokyo 2013, Kubota defeated late replacement opponent Maylee Won. Pomas by unanimous decision.

She was scheduled to fight Katie Klimansky-Casimir at Shootboxing 2014: Act 1 on February 23, 2014, but the fight was scrapped when the American fighter encountered immigration issues.

Kubota was scheduled to fight Yuri Kim at Shoot Boxing 2013: Tomohiro Oikawa Retirement Event on December 23, 2013. She won the fight by a first-round technical knockout.

Kubota faced Seo Hee Im at Shoot Boxing 2014: Act 2, on April 18, 2014. She won the fight by a first-round standing guillotine choke.

2014 Shoot Boxing Girls S-Cup 
Kubota participated in the 2014 Shoot Boxing Girls S-Cup tournament, and faced Simone van Dommelen in the quarterfinals. She beat Dommelen in the quarterfinals and Christina Jurjevic in the semifinals by unanimous decision. Kubota won the tournament with a second-round knockout of Thicha Rongrien Kila Korat.

Kubota was scheduled to fight Isis Verbeek at 2014 Shoot Boxing World S-Cup, on November 30, 2014. She beat Verbeek by unanimous decision.

Kubota fought Elli Maria Ekström at No Kick, No Life 2015, on February 11, 2015. Kubota won the fight by a second-round technical knockout.

Shoot Boxing Women's Flyweight champion
Kubota was scheduled to fight Kane Chopirom at Shoot Boxing Girls S-Cup 2015, on August 21, 2015, for the vacant Shoot Boxing Women's Flyweight championship. Kubota won the fight by a third-round technical knockout, stopping her opponent through a series of knees.

Kubota made her Rizin debut at the inaugural Rizin event, on April 17, 2016, against Cyndi Alves. She beat Alves by unanimous decision.

Kubota made her first title defense against Klaudia Pawicka at Shoot Boxing Girls S-Cup 2016, on July 7, 2016. She won the fight by a third-round technical knockout, forcing her opponent's corner to throw in the towel mid-way through the round.

Kubota's next fight was a non-title bout against Kinberly Novaes at Shoot Boxing World Tournament S-Cup 2016, on November 16, 2016. She won the fight by a unanimous decision.

Kubota fought Jleana Valentino in a non-title bout at Shoot Boxing Girl's S-Cup 2017, on July 7, 2017. She beat Valentino by unanimous decision.

Mixed martial arts career
Kubota made her mixed martial arts debut against a fellow debutante in Jleana Valentino at Rizin World Grand-Prix 2015: Part 2 - Iza on December 31, 2015. She won the fight by submission, landing a flying armbar in the second round.

Kubota was scheduled to fight another debutante, the three-time world wrestling champion Miyuu Yamamoto, at Rizin FF 2: Rizin World Grand-Prix 2016: 1st Round on September 25, 2016. Kubota won the fight by a first-round submission, locking in a guillotine choke with ten seconds left in the round.

Kubota was scheduled to fight Hanna Gujwan at Rizin FF 4: Rizin World Grand-Prix 2016: Final Round on December 31, 2016. After an even first round, Kubota scored several knockdowns in the second round. She won the fight by a third-round technical knockout, dropping Gujwan with two liver kicks.

Kubota was scheduled to fight Dóra Perjés at Rizin FF 5: Sakura on April 16, 2017. It was Perjés' first fight since March 14, 2015, when she suffered her first professional loss to Vuokko Katainen. She won the fight by a first-round technical knockout, dropping Perjés with a liver punch at the 2:48 minute mark.

Rizin Women's Super Atomweight GP 2017 
It was announced on August 8, 2017, that Kubota would participate in the Rizin Super Atomweight Grand Prix. She was scheduled to face the former King of the Cage Atomweight champion Andy Nguyen in the quarterfinal bout at Rizin World Grand Prix 2017: Opening Round - Part 2 on October 15, 2017. She won the fight by a first-round technical knockout. Kubota began landing to the body as soon as the fight started, and ended the fight with a liver punch at the 3:23 minute mark.

Advancing to the semifinals, Kubota faced Irene Cabello Rivera at Rizin World Grand-Prix 2017: Final Round on December 31, 2017. Kubota won the fight by a first-round technical knockout.

Kubota was scheduled to fight Kanna Asakura in the finals of the Atomweight Grand Prix, held at Rizin World Grand-Prix 2017: Final Round on December 31, 2017. Asakura won the fight by a first-round submission. She locked in a rear-naked choke which rendered Kubota unconscious with 30 seconds left in the round.

Post-Atomweight GP 
Kubota was scheduled to fight Elaine Leal at Shoot Boxing Girls S-Cup 2018, on July 6, 2018. It was her first mixed martial arts fight outside of Rizin. Kubota won the fight by unanimous decision.

Kubota was scheduled to fight a rematch with Kanna Asakura at Rizin 11, on July 29, 2018.  Asakura outworked Kubota to a unanimous decision victory.

Kubota was scheduled to fight Samantha Jean-Francois at Rizin 14 on December 31, 2018. Kubota later pulled out of the fight, with her teammate Mio Tsumura later explaing that Kubota withdrew due to a tough weight cut made worse by her menstrual cycle. The fight was rescheduled for Rizin 15 on April 21, 2019. Kubota won the fight by unanimous decision.

Kubota was scheduled to fight Lindsey VanZandt at Bellator 222 on June 14, 2019. VanZandt won the fight by a first-round submission, choking Kubota unconscious with a rear-naked choke.

It was announced that Kubota would face Shawna Ram at Rizin 19 on October 12, 2019. On October 7, Rizin president Sakakibara revealed that Ram withdrew from the bout after suffering a concussion in training. Ram was replaced by the 0-3 Alexandra Alvare. Kubota made quick work of Alvare, knocking her out after just 20 seconds.

Kubota was scheduled to fight a rematch with Lindsey VanZandt at Rizin 20 on December 31, 2019. The rematch was scheduled six months after their first meeting, which VanZandt won by submission. Kubota won by a third-round technical knockout, stopping her opponent with ground and pound with just 18 seconds left in the fight.

Kubota moved up to strawweight for her next bout against Emi Tomimatsu. She was scheduled to fight the former Jewels champion at Rizin 24 on September 27, 2020. Kubota won the fight by unanimous decision.

Kubota faced Miyuu Yamamoto at Rizin 32 on November 20, 2021. She won the bout after catching Yamamoto with a knee on a takedown attempt.

Kubota faced Si Woo Park at Rizin 33 - Saitama on December 31, 2021. She lost the fight by unanimous decision.

Kubota faced the unbeaten Anastasiya Svetkivska in the quarterfinals of the Rizin Super Atomweight Grand Prix at Rizin 37 - Saitama on July 31, 2022. She won the fight by unanimous decision. Kubota was expected to face Seika Izawa in the tournament semifinals, but was forced to withdraw due to injury, as her orbital bone fracture hadn't yet healed.

Kubota is scheduled to face Claire Lopez in a -51 kg catchweight bout at Rizin Landmark 5 on April 29, 2023.

Championships and accomplishments

Kickboxing
Shootboxing
 2009 Shoot Boxing Girls S-Cup winner
 2010 Shoot Boxing Girls S-Cup winner
 2012 Shoot Boxing Girls S-Cup winner
 2014 Shoot Boxing Girls S-Cup winner
 2015 Shoot Boxing's Women's Flyweight Championship
 2016 Shoot Boxing Girls S-Cup winner
 2017 Shoot Boxing Girls S-Cup winner
RISE
 2011 Rise Queen champion (vacated title)

Mixed martial arts
Rizin Fighting Federation
 2017 Rizin Women's Super Atomweight (49 kg) Runner-Up

Awards
Jewels
 2009 Special Award (Jewels, December 20, 2009)
eFight.jp
Fighter of the Month for November 2011, December 2015 and November 2021

Mixed martial arts record

|-
|Win
|align=center| 13–4
|Anastasiya Svetkivska
|Decision (unanimous)
|Rizin 37
|
|align=center| 3
|align=center| 5:00
|Saitama, Japan
|
|-
|Loss
|align=center|12–4
|Si Woo Park
|Decision (unanimous)
|Rizin 33
|
| align=center| 3
| align=center| 5:00
|Saitama, Japan
|
|-
|Win
|align=center|12–3
|Miyuu Yamamoto
|TKO (knee and punches)
|Rizin 32
|
|align=center|2
|align=center|3:35
|Okinawa, Japan
|
|-
|Win
|align=center|11–3
|Emi Tomimatsu
|Decision (unanimous)
|Rizin 24
|
|align=center|3
|align=center|5:00
|Saitama, Japan
|  Strawweight bout.
|-
|Win
|align=center|10–3
|Lindsey VanZandt	
|TKO (corner stoppage)
|Rizin 20
|
|align=center|3
|align=center|4:42
|Saitama, Japan
|
|-
|Win
|align=center|9–3
|Alexandra Alvare
|TKO (punches)
|Rizin 19
|
|align=center|1
|align=center|0:20
|Osaka, Japan
|
|-
|Loss
|align=center|8–3
|Lindsey VanZandt	
|Technical Submission (rear-naked choke)
|Bellator 222
|
|align=center|1
|align=center|4:04
|New York, New York, United States
|
|-
|Win
|align=center|8–2
|Samantha Jean-Francois
|Decision (unanimous)
|Rizin 15
|
|align=center|3
|align=center|5:00
|Yokohama, Japan
|
|-
|Loss
|align=center|7–2
|Kanna Asakura
|Decision (unanimous)
|Rizin 11
|
|align=center|3
|align=center|5:00
|Saitama, Japan
|
|-
|Win
|align=center|7–1
|Elaine Leal
|Decision (unanimous)
|Shoot Boxing Girls S-Cup 2018
|
|align=center|3
|align=center|5:00
|Tokyo, Japan
|
|-
|Loss
|align=center|6–1
|Kanna Asakura
|Technical Submission (rear-naked choke)
|Rizin World Grand-Prix 2017: Final Round
|
|align=center|1
|align=center|4:33
|Saitama, Japan
| 2017 Rizin Super Atomweight Grand-Prix Final.
|-
|Win
|align=center|6–0
|Irene Cabello Rivera
|TKO (punches)
|Rizin World Grand-Prix 2017: Final Round
|
|align=center|1
|align=center|4:38
|Saitama, Japan
| 2017 Rizin Super Atomweight Grand-Prix Semi-Finals.
|-
|Win
|align=center|5–0
|Andy Nguyen
|TKO (body punch)
|Rizin World Grand Prix 2017: Opening Round - Part 2
|
|align=center|1
|align=center|3:23
|Fukuoka, Japan
| 2017 Rizin Super Atomweight Grand Prix Quarterfinals.
|-
|Win
|align=center|4–0
|Dóra Perjés
|TKO (body punch)
|Rizin FF 5: Sakura
|
|align=center|1
|align=center|2:48
|Yokohama, Japan
|
|-
|Win
|align=center|3–0
|Hanna Gujwan
|TKO (body kick)
|Rizin FF 4: Rizin World Grand-Prix 2016: Final Round
|
|align=center|3
|align=center|2:47
|Saitama, Japan
|
|-
|Win
|align=center|2–0
|Miyuu Yamamoto
|Submission (guillotine choke)
|Rizin FF 2: Rizin World Grand-Prix 2016: 1st Round
|
|align=center|1
|align=center|4:50
|Saitama, Japan
|
|-
|Win
|align=center|1–0
|Jleana Valentino
|Submission (armbar)
|Rizin World Grand-Prix 2015: Part 2 - Iza
|
|align=center|2
|align=center|3:31
|Saitama, Japan
|
|-

Kickboxing and shoot boxing record

|-  bgcolor="#CCFFCC"
| 2017-07-07 || Win ||align=left| Jleana Valentino || Shoot Boxing Girl's S-Cup 2017 || Tokyo, Japan || Decision (unanimous) || 3 || 3:00 || 35-5-1
|-
|-  bgcolor="#CCFFCC"
| 2016-11-16 || Win ||align=left| Kinberly Novaes || Shoot Boxing World Tournament S-Cup 2016 || Tokyo, Japan || Decision (unanimous) || 3 || 3:00 || 34-5-1
|-  bgcolor="#CCFFCC"
| 2016-07-07 || Win ||align=left| Klaudia Pawicka || Shoot Boxing Girls S-Cup 2016 || Tokyo, Japan || TKO (corner stoppage) || 3 || 1:42 || 33-5-1
|-
! style=background:white colspan=9 |
|-
|-  bgcolor="#CCFFCC"
| 2016-04-17 || Win ||align=left| Cyndi Alves || Rizin 1 || Nagoya, Japan || Decision (unanimous) || 3 || 3:00 || 32-5-1
|-
|-  bgcolor="#CCFFCC"
| 2015-08-21 || Win ||align=left| Kane Chopirom || Shoot Boxing Girls S-Cup 2015 || Tokyo, Japan || TKO (strikes) || 3 || 1:58 || 31-5-1
|-
! style=background:white colspan=9 |
|-
|-  bgcolor="#CCFFCC"
| 2015-02-11 || Win ||align=left| Elli Maria Ekström || No Kick, No Life 2015 || Tokyo, Japan || TKO (punches) || 2 || 2:31 || 30-5-1
|-  bgcolor="#CCFFCC"
| 2014-11-30 || Win ||align=left| Isis Verbeek || 2014 Shoot Boxing World S-Cup || Tokyo, Japan || Decision (unanimous) || 3 || 3:00 || 29-5-1
|-  bgcolor="#CCFFCC"
| 2014-08-02 || Win ||align=left| Thicha Rongrien Kila Korat || 2014 Shoot Boxing Girls S-Cup, Final || Shibuya, Tokyo, Japan || KO (punch) || 2 || 1:15 || 28-5-1
|-
! style=background:white colspan=9 |
|-
|-  bgcolor="#CCFFCC"
| 2014-08-02 || Win ||align=left| Christina Jurjevic || 2014 Shoot Boxing Girls S-Cup, Semi-Final || Shibuya, Tokyo, Japan || Decision (unanimous) || 3 || 2:00 || 27-5-1
|-  bgcolor="#CCFFCC"
| 2014-08-02 || Win ||align=left| Simone van Dommelen || 2014 Shoot Boxing Girls S-Cup, Quarterfinal || Shibuya, Tokyo, Japan || Decision (unanimous) || 3 || 2:00 || 26-5-1
|-  bgcolor="#CCFFCC"
| 2014-04-18 || Win ||align=left| Seo Hee Im || Shoot Boxing 2014: Act 2 || Koto, Tokyo, Japan || KO (standing guillotine choke) || 1 || 2:50 || 25-5-1
|-  bgcolor="#CCFFCC"
| 2013-12-23 || Win ||align=left| Yuri Kim || Shoot Boxing 2013: Tomohiro Oikawa Retirement Event || Koto, Tokyo, Japan || TKO (punches) || 1 || 2:40 || 24-5-1
|-  bgcolor="#CCFFCC"
| 2013-11-16 || Win ||align=left| Maylee Won. Pomas || Shoot Boxing Battle Summit: Ground Zero Tokyo 2013 || Sumida, Tokyo, Japan || Decision (unanimous) || 3 || 3:00 || 23-5-1
|-  bgcolor="#CCFFCC"
| 2013-08-03 || Win ||align=left| Lorena Klijn || 2013 Shoot Boxing Girls S-Cup || Shibuya, Tokyo, Japan || Decision (majority) || 4 (Ex.1) || 3:00 || 22-5-1
|-  bgcolor="#CCFFCC"
| 2013-04-20 || Win ||align=left| Du Peiling || Shoot Boxing 2013: Act 2 || Koto, Tokyo, Japan || KO (standing rear-naked choke) || 3 || 1:12 || 21-5-1
|-  bgcolor="#CCFFCC"
| 2012-08-25 || Win ||align=left| Mei Yamaguchi || 2012 Shoot Boxing Girls S-Cup, Final || Shibuya, Tokyo, Japan || Decision (unanimous) || 3 || 2:00 || 20-5-1
|-
! style=background:white colspan=9 |
|-
|-  bgcolor="#CCFFCC"
| 2012-08-25 || Win ||align=left| Seo Hee Ham || 2012 Shoot Boxing Girls S-Cup, Semi-Final || Shibuya, Tokyo, Japan || Decision (unanimous) || 4 (Ex.1) || 2:00 || 19-5-1
|-  bgcolor="#CCFFCC"
| 2012-08-25 || Win ||align=left| Kim Townsend || 2012 Shoot Boxing Girls S-Cup, Quarterfinal || Shibuya, Tokyo, Japan || Decision (unanimous) || 3 || 2:00 || 18-5-1
|-  bgcolor="#CCFFCC"
| 2011-11-23 || Win ||align=left| Erika Kamimura || Rise 85: Rise Heavyweight Tournament 2011 || Bunkyo, Tokyo, Japan || Decision (unanimous) || 5 || 3:00 || 17-5-1
|-
! style=background:white colspan=9 |
|-
|-  bgcolor="#FFBBBB"
| 2011-09-10 || Loss ||align=left| Jessica Penne || Shoot Boxing 2011: Act 4 || Koto, Tokyo, Japan || Decision (majority) || 5 (Ex.2) || 3:00 || 16-5-1
|-  bgcolor="CCFFCC"
| 2011-08-19 || Win ||align=left| Zaza Sor. Aree || 2011 Shoot Boxing Girls S-Cup || Shibuya, Tokyo, Japan || KO (body punch) || 2 || 2:10 || 16-4-1
|-  bgcolor="#FFBBBB"
| 2011-06-05 || Loss ||align=left| Ai Takahashi || Shoot Boxing 2011: Act 3 || Koto, Tokyo, Japan || Decision (unanimous) || 5 || 3:00 || 15-4-1
|-
! style=background:white colspan=9 |
|-
|-  bgcolor="#CCFFCC"
| 2010-08-29 || Win ||align=left| Ai Takahashi || 2010 Shoot Boxing Girls S-Cup, Final || Chiyoda, Tokyo, Japan || Decision (unanimous) || 5 (Ex.2) || 2:00 || 15-3-1
|-
! style=background:white colspan=9 |
|-
|-  bgcolor="#CCFFCC"
| 2010-08-29 || Win ||align=left| Kate Martinez || 2010 Shoot Boxing Girls S-Cup, Semi-Final || Chiyoda, Tokyo, Japan || Decision (unanimous) || 3 || 2:00 || 14-3-1
|-  bgcolor="#CCFFCC"
| 2010-08-29 || Win ||align=left| Hisae Watanabe || 2010 Shoot Boxing Girls S-Cup, Quarterfinal || Chiyoda, Tokyo, Japan || TKO (knee to the body) || 2 || 1:50 || 13-3-1
|-  bgcolor="#CCFFCC"
| 2010-06-06 || Win ||align=left| Mika Nagai || Shoot Boxing 25th Anniversary Series: Ishin 3rd || Koto, Tokyo, Japan || Decision (unanimous) || 3 || 2:00 || 12-3-1
|-  bgcolor="#CCFFCC"
| 2010-02-13 || Win ||align=left| Christina Jurjevic || Shoot Boxing 25th Anniversary Series: Kaimakusen || Koto, Tokyo, Japan || Decision (unanimous) || 3 || 2:00 || 11-3-1
|-  bgcolor="#CCFFCC"
| 2009-11-18 || Win ||align=left| Emi Fujino || Shoot Boxing 2009 - Bushido 5th || Koto, Tokyo, Japan || TKO (doctor stoppage) || 2 || 2:00 || 10-3-1
|-  bgcolor="#CCFFCC"
| 2009-08-23 || Win ||align=left| Mei Yamaguchi || 2009 Shoot Boxing Girls S-Cup, Final || Koto, Tokyo, Japan || Decision (unanimous) || 3 || 2:00 || 9-3-1
|-
! style=background:white colspan=9 |
|-
|-  bgcolor="#CCFFCC"
| 2009-08-23 || Win ||align=left| Saori Ishioka || 2009 Shoot Boxing Girls S-Cup, Semi-Final|| Koto, Tokyo, Japan || TKO (corner stoppage) || 3 || 0:20 || 8-3-1
|-  bgcolor="#CCFFCC"
| 2009-08-23 || Win ||align=left| Masako Yoshida || 2009 Shoot Boxing Girls S-Cup, Quarterfinal || Koto, Tokyo, Japan || Decision (unanimous) || 3 || 2:00 || 7-3-1
|-  bgcolor="#CCFFCC"
| 2009-07-11 || Win ||align=left| Tomoko SP || Jewels 4th Ring || Koto, Tokyo, Japan || Decision (unanimous) || 3 || 3:00 || 6-3-1
|-  bgcolor="#FFBBBB"
| 2009-03-20 || Loss ||align=left| Su Jeong Lim || K-1 Award & MAX Korea 2009 || Seoul, South Korea || Decision (split) || 4 (Ex.1) || 2:00 || 5-3-1
|-  bgcolor="#FFBBBB"
| 2008-11-24 || Loss ||align=left| Miku Matsumoto || Shoot Boxing World Tournament 2008 || Saitama, Saitama, Japan || Decision (unanimous) || 3 || 2:00 || 5-2-1
|-  bgcolor="#CCFFCC"
| 2008-07-21 || Win ||align=left| Misato Tomita || Shoot Boxing 2008: Road to S-Cup 4th || Bunkyo, Tokyo, Japan || Decision (unanimous) || 4 (Ex.1) || 2:00 || 5-1-1
|-  bgcolor="#c5d2ea"
| 2008-06-01 || Draw ||align=left| Miku Matsumoto || ClubDEEP Toyama Barbarian Festival 7 || Toyama, Toyama, Japan || Draw (majority) || 2 || 3:00 || 4-1-1
|-  bgcolor="#CCFFCC"
| 2008-04-04 || Win ||align=left| Yuka Okumura || Shoot Boxing 2008: Road to S-Cup 2nd || Bunkyo, Tokyo, Japan || Decision (unanimous) || 3 || 2:00 || 4-1-0
|-  bgcolor="#CCFFCC"
| 2008-02-03 || Win ||align=left| Yukiko Seki || Shoot Boxing 2008: Road to S-Cup 1st || Bunkyo, Tokyo, Japan || TKO (doctor stoppage) || 2 || 1:49 || 3-1-0
|-  bgcolor="#CCFFCC"
| 2007-12-23 || Win ||align=left| Kanako Oka || Shoot Boxing 2007: Mu-So 5th || Osaka, Osaka, Japan || Decision (majority) || 3 || 2:00 || 2-1-0
|-  bgcolor="#CCFFCC"
| 2007-11-04 || Win ||align=left| Mika Nagai || J-Girls - World Queen Tournament || Koto, Tokyo, Japan || Decision (unanimous) || 3 || 2:00 || 1-1-0
|-  bgcolor="#FFBBBB"
| 2007-07-01 || Loss ||align=left| Asami Furuya || J-Girls - New Heroine Coming!, Semi-Final || Shinjuku, Tokyo, Japan || Decision (split) || 3 || 2:00 || 0-1-0
|-
! style=background:white colspan=9 |
|-
| colspan=9 | Legend:

See also
List of current Rizin FF fighters
 List of female kickboxers

References

External links
 Shoot boxing profile 
 K-1 profile 
 Team Oikawa profile 
 Official blog 
 Official blog (old) 
 Official blog (old) 

1991 births
Japanese female kickboxers
Japanese female karateka
Living people
Japanese female mixed martial artists
Sportspeople from Osaka
Strawweight mixed martial artists
Atomweight mixed martial artists
Mixed martial artists utilizing karate
Mixed martial artists utilizing shootboxing